Batrachorhina kenyana is a species of beetle in the family Cerambycidae. It was described by Stephan von Breuning in 1958. It is known from Kenya, Zambia and Malawi.

References

Batrachorhina
Beetles described in 1958